Peter Raymond Cargill (2 March 1964 – 15 April 2005) was a Jamaican international football player. His position was midfielder or defender.

Club career
Nicknamed "Jair", he started his footballing career at high school, winning the Triple Crown as a captain with Camperdown High School. Cargill also played for local sides Swallowfield FC, CC Lions, Hazard United and Harbour View and also spent 8 years in Israel with Maccabi Netanya and Hapoel Petah Tikva. The versatile player returned to Jamaica in 1996 and was called up to the Jamaica team.

International career
He captained the Reggae Boyz and was a participant at the 1998 FIFA World Cup in France. He collected a total of 84 caps and scored 3 times.

Personal life
After retiring as a player, he became Reggae Boyz' assistant head coach until 2004. Then he coached Jamaica National Premier League side Waterhouse F.C.

Like his World Cup team-mate Stephen Malcolm and Jamaican legend Winston Anglin, Cargill was killed in a road accident. He died of severe injuries in Saint Ann Parish while on his way to a football match against Wadadah in Montego Bay when the minivan he was travelling in overturned and struck a boulder head-on.

International goals

Honours
Israeli Premier League:
Runner-up (1): 1987–88
Toto Cup:
Runner-up (1): 1988–89
Caribbean Cup:
Winner (2): 1991, 1998
JFF Champions Cup:
Winner (1): 1998

References

External links

1964 births
2005 deaths
People from Saint Ann Parish
Association football midfielders
Jamaican footballers
Jamaica international footballers
1998 CONCACAF Gold Cup players
1998 FIFA World Cup players
Harbour View F.C. players
Portmore United F.C. players
Maccabi Netanya F.C. players
Hapoel Petah Tikva F.C. players
Jamaican expatriate footballers
Expatriate footballers in Israel
Jamaican expatriate sportspeople in Israel
Road incident deaths in Jamaica